"T'en va pas" (Eng. "Don't Go Away") is a 1986 song recorded by the French artist Elsa Lunghini. Released as a single on 12 October 1986, this song, her debut single, was the soundtrack of the 1986 movie La Femme de ma vie. It was a smash hit in France.

Background
In the movie, Elsa portrayed Jane Birkin's daughter and played the piano in a short scene. Finally, a whole song had been composed by Romano Musumarra, who decided to release it as a single. Musumarra had already worked and helped produce hits for two famous French artists of the 80s—Jeanne Mas ("En Rouge et Noir") and Princess Stephanie of Monaco ("Ouragan").

"T'en va pas" was a huge hit in France, and managed to export itself across Europe with an English recording : "Papa, Please Don't Go". It became well known in Japan because it was used for Jeans' TV commercial there. Also in Japan, Tite Kubo used the song as the image song for the character Orihime Inoue from Bleach. It also was used as the image song for the character Yumisuka Satsuki from Tsukihime. In 2008 the song was used in television commercials for Impulse brand deodorant, in Argentina. The song was available in the French and English languages on the best of Elsa, l'essentiel 1986-1993.

The music video shows images from the movie alternating with Elsa performing the song.

In the mid-2000s, the song was covered in a live version by Priscilla on the TV show Absolument 80 broadcast on M6.

Chart performances
"T'en va pas" had a huge success in France. It debuted at number 26 on the chart edition of 6 December 1986 and reached the top ten the week after. In the fifth week, it topped the chart and there stayed for eight consecutive weeks. Certified Gold disc by the Syndicat National de l'Édition Phonographique for over 500,000 copies sold, the single remained for 18 weeks in the top ten and for 25 weeks on the chart. At the time, Elsa became the youngest artist to reach number one on the French Singles Chart, therefore appeared on the Guinness Book of Records, as she was 13 years old; however, her record was beaten in 1993 by Jordy.

Worldwide, about 1,3 million singles were sold.

Track listings
 7" single
 "T'en va pas" (single version) – 3:50
 "T'en va pas" (instrumental) – 4:45

 12" maxi
 "T'en va pas" (remix) – 5:32
 "T'en va pas" (instrumental) – 5:32

 7" single - English version   
 "Papa Please Don't Go" (single version) – 4:00
 "T'en va pas" (instrumental) – 3:50

 12" maxi - English version
 "Papa Please Don't Go" (remix) – 5:25
 "Papa Please Don't Go" (instrumental) – 5:25

Production
Arrangement & producer: Romano Musumarra
Engineered by Gianpaolo Bresciani at Titania Studios, Rome

Charts and sales

Peak positions

Year-end charts

Certifications

See also
 List of number-one singles of 1987 (France)

References

1986 debut singles
Elsa Lunghini songs
SNEP Top Singles number-one singles
Songs written for films
Songs written by Romano Musumarra